Tippo Bayou is a stream in the U.S. state of Mississippi.

Opinions are divided whether this creek is named after the Ibitoupa Indian tribe, or a name derived from the Choctaw language meaning "severed, parted, separated".

References

Rivers of Mississippi
Rivers of Leflore County, Mississippi
Rivers of Tallahatchie County, Mississippi
Mississippi placenames of Native American origin